Trachylepis raymondlaurenti, also known commonly as Laurent's long-tailed skink, is a species of lizard in the family Scincidae. The species is endemic to Africa.

Etymology
The specific name, raymondlaurenti, is in honor of Belgian herpetologist Raymond Ferdinand Laurent.

Geographic range
T. raymondlaurenti is found in Angola,  Democratic Republic of the Congo, and Zambia.

Description
Medium-sized for its genus, T. raymondlaurenti may attain a snout-to-vent length (SVL) of almost . The tail is very long, more than twice SVL.

Reproduction
The mode of reproduction of T. raymondlaurenti is unknown.

References

Further reading
Marques MP, Ceríaco LMP, Bandeira S, Pauwels OSG, Bauer AM (2019). "Description of a new long-tailed skink (Scincidae: Trachylepis) from Angola and the Democratic Republic of the Congo". Zootaxa 4568 (1): 051–068. (Trachylepis raymondlaurenti, new species).

Trachylepis
Reptiles described in 2019
Taxa named by Mariana P. Marques
Taxa named by Luis M. P. Ceríaco
Taxa named by Suzana Bandeira
Taxa named by Olivier Sylvain Gérard Pauwels
Taxa named by Aaron M. Bauer